Here Is Phineas (subtitled The Piano Artistry of Phineas Newborn Jr.) is the debut album by American jazz pianist Phineas Newborn Jr. recorded in May 1956 and released on the Atlantic label in August 1956.

Reception
The Allmusic review by Scott Yanow states "some listeners may shake their heads at his constant outpouring of technically impossible runs (those speedy octaves are ridiculous) – but if one has chops on this level, one should feel free to display them. This is a dazzling debut from an ill-fated but classic pianist". Reviewing the reissued album for JazzTimes, Miles Jordan wrote "Praised in some quarters for his 'fabulous technique' and damned in others for his 'lack of feeling,' Phineas (say 'Finus') Newborn, Jr. burst onto the NYC scene from Memphis like a sky rocket".

Track listing
 "Barbados" (Charlie Parker) – 4:01
 "All the Things You Are" (Oscar Hammerstein II, Jerome Kern) – 7:22
 "The More I See You" (Mack Gordon, Harry Warren) – 4:01
 "Celia" (Bud Powell) – 3:06
 "Daahoud" (Clifford Brown) – 3:34
 "Newport Blues" (Phineas Newborn Jr.) – 4:32
 "I'm Beginning to See the Light" (Duke Ellington, Don George, Johnny Hodges, Harry James) – 3:05
 "Afternoon in Paris" (John Lewis) – 6:45

Personnel
Phineas Newborn Jr. – piano
Calvin Newborn – guitar (tracks 1, 2, 5 & 8)
Oscar Pettiford – bass (tracks 1, 2, 4, 5, 7 & 8)
Kenny Clarke – drums  (tracks 1, 2, 4, 5, 7 & 8)

References

Atlantic Records albums
Phineas Newborn Jr. albums
Albums produced by Nesuhi Ertegun
Albums recorded at Van Gelder Studio
1956 albums